Sardar Usman Ahmad Khan Buzdar (born 1 May 1969) is a Pakistani politician and previously served as Chief Minister of The Punjab from 20 August 2018 to 30 April 2022. He had been a member of the Provincial Assembly of Punjab from August 2018 till January 2023 and servesd as parliamentary leader for Pakistan Tehreek-e-Insaf in the Provincial Assembly of Punjab. Belonging from a Baloch family, he is the Tumandar of the Baloch tribe Buzdar, since April 2019. He served as Tehsil Nazim of Tehsil Tribal Area from 2001 to 2008.

Early life and education
He was born in May 1969 in Dera Ghazi Khan to Sardar Fateh Muhammad Buzdar. He belongs to the Buzdar clan, which is a Baloch tribe settled in southern Punjab.  Buzdar received his early education from Government Boys Primary School in Barthi, Punjab. He completed his Intermediate-level education from a Government College in Multan and received a degree of bachelor of laws from the Law College, Multan where he also practiced law at consumer courts for three years during his post graduation  Buzdar received a master's degree in political science from Bahauddin Zakariya University.

Political career
In 2001, he joined Pakistan Muslim League (Q) (PML-Q). In August 2001, he was elected Tehsil Nazim of Tribal Area(Koh e Sulieman) where he served until 2008.

He quit PML-Q after 2008 general election and joined a forward bloc. According to another report, he remained politically affiliated with PML-Q until 2011.

He joined Pakistan Muslim League (Nawaz) (PML-N) prior to 2013 general election and ran for the seat of the Provincial Assembly of the Punjab as a candidate of PML-N from Constituency PP-241 (Dera Ghazi Khan-II), but was unsuccessful. He received 22,875 votes and lost the seat to Khawaja Muhammad Nizam-ul-Mehmood.

Along with other rebel PML-N members, he joined Janoobi Punjab Suba Mahaz prior to the 2018 general election The bloc has advocated for the creation of South Punjab province. Janoobi Punjab Suba Mahaz merged with Pakistan Tehreek-e-Insaf (PTI) in May 2018. Buzdar joined PTI and was allocated PTI ticket to contest the 2018 general election from Constituency PP-286 (Dera Ghazi Khan-II).
 
He was elected to the Provincial Assembly of the Punjab as a candidate of PTI from Constituency PP-286 (Dera Ghazi Khan-II) in the 2018 general election. He received 26,897 votes and defeated an independent candidate, Sardar Muhammad Akram Khan.

Chief Ministership
On 17 August 2018, Imran Khan nominated him as PTI's candidate for the office of Chief Minister of Punjab. His nomination surprised many in the PTI and received criticism, as he was a relatively lesser known figure in Pakistan's political spectrum. According to Khan, he chose to support Buzdar because Buzdar hailed from an economically backwards area of Punjab, and was the only member of the Punjab Assembly who lacked electricity at his home. Other analysts claimed the selection was because Buzdar lacked an independent power base, and was thus totally reliant on Khan to hold on to his post.

On 19 August 2018, he was elected as the Chief Minister of Punjab. He received 186 votes against his opponent Hamza Shahbaz Sharif who secured 159 votes. He was sworn in as Chief Minister of Punjab on 20 August 2018.

Under his watch as the Chief Minister, five Inspector General of the Punjab police have been changed.

Cabinet
After assuming the office as the Chief Minister of Punjab, Buzdar held consultation with Imran Khan and formed a 23-member cabinet. The 23-member cabinet sworn in on 27 August 2018. The second part of his cabinet, consisting of 12 provincial ministers was sworn in on 13 September 2018 increasing the size of the cabinet to 35.

Buzdar was falsely criticized for incompetent management during his tenure as chief minister.

On 28 March 2022, Buzdar offered his resignation as Chief Minister of Punjab to Prime Minister Imran Khan to ease the political crises surrounding No-confidence motion against Imran Khan Buzdar had to be removed as the powerful Pakistan army wanted to install Aleem Khan as CM Punjab who was a notorious property tycoon. This cited as one potential reason for the Pakistan Army's loss of confidence in the PTI government more broadly, as the province is the main base of the Army's enlisted ranks.

On 1 April 2022, his resignation was accepted by the Governor of Punjab, however he will continue to remain in office until the appointment of the new Chief Minister.

On 30 April 2022, he left office of Chief Minister when Hamza Shahbaz took oath as newly elected chief minister.

Controversies and scandals
Following his nomination for the office of Chief Minister of Punjab in August 2018, reports had surfaced that a police case was registered against Buzdar and his father Sardar Fateh Muhammad Buzdar for their involvement in the murder of at-least six people during local bodies elections in 1998. According to reports, an anti-terrorism court in Dera Ghazi Khan found Buzdar guilty and convicted him in January 2000. Following which, Buzdar's father paid Rs 7,500,000 as blood money to the victim's family to settle the murder case through a jirga. On 22 August 2018, Geo News reported that it was a case of mistaken identity and that Buzdar is not the same person who was accused for the murders.
During his tenure as Nazim, he was accused of making 300 bogus appointments. An application was filed against him in the National Accountability Bureau (NAB) in September 2016, however NAB failed to carry out investigation. Buzdar's brother denied the accusation claiming NAB was unable to find evidences against Buzdar after which the case was closed.

Personal life and net worth
In April 2019, after death of his father, he was made tumandar of the Baloch tribe of Buzdar. He is married and has 3 daughters. 

According to documents submitted to the Election Commission of Pakistan in 2018, Buzdar declared his assets worth Rs. 25 million. He declared that he owns three tractors and two cars worth Rs 2.4 million and worth Rs 3.6 million, respectively.

References

Living people
1969 births
Pakistani people convicted of murder
Pakistani politicians convicted of crimes
Baloch people
Punjab MPAs 2018–2023
Chief Ministers of Punjab, Pakistan
Mayors of places in Pakistan
Pakistan Tehreek-e-Insaf MPAs (Punjab)
Bahauddin Zakariya University alumni
People from Dera Ghazi Khan District
Tumandars